Mount Dewe is a mountain in the southeast part of the Hauberg Mountains in Palmer Land, Antarctica. It was mapped by the United States Geological Survey from ground surveys and U.S. Navy air photos, 1961–67, and was named by the Advisory Committee on Antarctic Names for Michael B. Dewe, a glaciologist at Byrd Station, summer 1965–66.

References 

Mountains of Palmer Land